Gavin Williamson (Winnipeg, 1897 - Chicago, 1989) was an American pianist, harpsichordist, organist and music educator. With pianist Philip Manuel, he formed a duo in 1922 that helped promote the professional use of harpsichords in the United States.

Life and career
Gavin Williamson was born in Winnipeg, Manitoba. He studied music at the University of Chicago and was a Fellow of Oxford University studying with Artur Schnabel, Ethel Leginska and Theodor Leschetizky.

At the University of Chicago, Williamson met Philip Manuel (1893–1959) and the two developed an interest in harpsichord as a concert instrument. At this time in the 1920s, there were fewer than 50 harpsichords in the United States, most located in museums. The two men went to Paris in search of a builder, where they contracted with Pleyel et Cie to produce two instruments for their use. With these instruments, they initiated concert tours of the United States, and also worked as teachers of harpsichord, piano and voice. The two frequently played with the Chicago Symphony Orchestra, and were broadcast on the National Broadcasting Company radio network.

After his partner died in 1959, Williamson continued this career as a solo performer and music teacher. He died in Chicago at age 92. Notable students include Alexander Frey, Dina Koston and Rosalyn Tureck.

Discography
Concerto in C Major for 3 Harpsichords and Strings / Les cyclopes - Manuel and Williamson Harpsichord Ensemble with the Chicago Symphony Orchestra (1948)
Concerto in C Major for 2 Harpsichords and Strings/Musette de Taverny - Manuel and Williamson with the Chicago Symphony Orchestra (1948)

See also
Philip Manuel
Ethel Leginska
Artur Schnabel
Theodor Leschetizky

References

1897 births
1989 deaths
American harpsichordists
American music educators
Pupils of Artur Schnabel
University of Chicago alumni
20th-century classical musicians
20th-century American pianists
American male pianists
20th-century American male musicians